The 2012–13 season was Iraklis first season in the Football League since 1980-81 and second overall. Iraklis finished 6th in the Football League, thus qualifying for the division's Play-offs. Their 2nd place in the Play-offs was not enough to earn promotion to the Greek Super League.

The "blue-whites" lost their single Greek Cup game to Proodeftiki and were eliminated from the competition early, in October 2012.

Players

First team

Transfers

In

Summer

Winter

Out

Summer

Winter

Loan out

Club

Coaching staff

Other information

Kit

|
|
|

Pre-season and friendlies

Football League

League table

Results summary

Results by round

Matches

Promotion play-offs

Matches

Greek Cup

First round

Statistics

Appearances and goals

|-
|colspan="14"|Players who left the club in-season

Top scorers
Includes all competitive matches. The list is sorted by shirt number when total goals are equal.

Top assists
Includes all competitive matches. The list is sorted by shirt number when total assists are equal.

Disciplinary record
Includes all competitive matches. The list is sorted by shirt number when total cards are equal.

References

Greek football clubs 2012–13 season
2012-13